The High Court of Eritrea is the final court of appeal in Eritrea and the highest court in the Eritrean judicial hierarchy. It has both original and appellate jurisdiction.

A panel of three judges hears all original cases.  However, when the High Court is serving final appeals, a panel of five judges hears the trial.

In 2005, The High Court took an average of 2 months to decide if it would hear an appeal, and at year's end had a backlog of approximately 200 cases.

References

Judiciary of Eritrea